Joseph Turner (1701–1783) was a seaman, merchant, iron manufacturer, and politician in colonial and post-colonial Philadelphia, Pennsylvania.

Turner was born in 1701 in Hampshire, England. He came to America in January 1714. Early Philadelphia records identify him as a sea captain in 1724 and a businessman in 1726. For many decades prior to the American Revolution, he was in business with Chief Justice William Allen; their firm, Allen & Turner, was one of the most important in the colonies. Turner entered into trade agreements and iron mining and manufacture ventures, including the Union Iron Works in Hunterdon County, New Jersey, at present-day High Bridge, New Jersey. With Allen and others, Turner participated in the importation and trade of slaves, which was then legal.

Turner was also involved in politics. He was elected as a Philadelphia city councilman in 1729, an alderman in 1741, and a member of Pennsylvania's Provincial Council in 1747. In 1745, Abram Taylor was elected mayor of Philadelphia, then a non-paying office, but declined to serve, for which he was fined thirty pounds; Council then elected Turner to the office but he likewise refused it, for which he was similarly fined.

Turner was a member of Benjamin Franklin's Junto and of the Dancing Assembly of 1748. He was also a founder in 1749 of the Academy and Charitable School of Philadelphia, and then of the College of Philadelphia (now the University of Pennsylvania) and served as a trustee of these institutions until his death in 1783.

During the American Revolution, Turner remained a staunch loyalist.

See also
Graeme Park

References

External links
Biography at the University of Pennsylvania

1701 births
1783 deaths
People of colonial Pennsylvania
Pennsylvania lawyers
Loyalists in the American Revolution from Pennsylvania
Colonial American merchants
People from Hampshire (before 1974)
University of Pennsylvania people
Philadelphia City Council members
School founders
English emigrants